Daisy Midgeley is a fictional character from the ITV soap opera Coronation Street, played by Charlotte Jordan. The character was mentioned by stepmother Jenny Bradley (Sally Ann Matthews) in October 2020, and a month later, the soap announced Jordan's casting as Daisy. Daisy made her first appearance on 27 November 2020. From her arrival, she takes a dislike to Jenny's husband Johnny Connor (Richard Hawley) and works on getting Jenny to leave him. Her other storylines have involved her short term crushes on men who are in relationships, becoming involved in a multi-level marketing scheme, blackmailing Ronnie Bailey (Vinta Morgan) and falling victim to stalking.

The production team on Coronation Street have expressed potential plans for Daisy to become a villain on the soap, which received the support of actress Jordan. She felt that Daisy has the potential to become an "iconic bad girl" like fellow character Tracy Barlow (Kate Ford). However, since troublemaking ventures, her backstory has been explored with her struggling with abandonment issues throughout her childhood and she has since developed a relationship with Daniel Osbourne (Rob Mallard). Daisy has been well received by viewers.

Casting
A month prior to the announcement of her casting, Daisy was mentioned on-screen by Jenny Bradley (Sally Ann Matthews), who was phoning the character, and it is explained that despite the breakdown of Jenny's marriage with Daisy's father, she kept in touch with Daisy over the years. Jess Lee of Digital Spy stated that Jenny is delighted to see Daisy again, but noted that she will "cause trouble during her time in Weatherfield". ITV stated that there is "a lot more to Daisy than her sweet name suggests", with producer Ian MacLeod stating: "Daisy might seem like sweetness and light at first, but can be a maelstrom of minxy mischief when the mood takes her. She revels in devilment and can be very self-serving, but she's fiercely loyal to those she cares about - although her loyalties can change in a heartbeat", adding that Daisy's motive is to "bring chaos and conflict into Jenny's life". Actress Charlotte Jordan said that she was "thrilled" to be joining Coronation Street during the 60th anniversary of the soap, and noted that it was especially great to be cast in the midst of the ongoing pandemic. In May 2021, Jordan revealed to Digital Spy that her contract had been extended until September 2021 and expressed hopes for it to be renewed again.

Storylines
Daisy arrives at the Rovers Return Inn alongside boyfriend Lee (Oliver Devoti) to visit Jenny. Jenny hosts a small gathering for Daisy and Lee with her husband, Johnny Connor (Richard Hawley), which turns into an argument between Jenny and Johnny. When Johnny is arrested by the police at the gathering, Daisy offers to move in with Jenny to support her. She repeatedly lets Jenny know that Johnny is not good enough for her and that she deserves better than him, which Jenny denies and pledges to stick by Johnny throughout his prison sentence. When Daisy meets David Platt (Jack P. Shepherd), she takes a liking to him and attempts to get with him, but is warned off by his wife Shona Platt (Julia Goulding). The same occurs when she begins liking Ryan Connor (Ryan Prescott), who is in a relationship with Alya Nazir (Sair Khan).

Daisy becomes involved in a business venture with Sean Tully (Antony Cotton) titled Double Glammy, a multi-level marketing scheme. Despite other people falling into debt through the scheme, Daisy makes a large profit on her sales and introduces Sean's friend Carol Hill (Emma Hartley-Miller) to the scheme to make more money, which Sean is infuriated by when he finds out. Daisy discovers that Jenny has had sex with Ronnie Bailey (Vinta Morgan) days before Johnny's release and blackmails Ronnie into supporting her Double Glammy business ventures, threatening to expose their betrayal if he does not comply. Jenny discovers Daisy's blackmail and tells her to leave the Rovers, until Daisy opens up about the real reason she came to stay with Jenny. She explains that after her half-brother Tom died and Jenny left, her father remarried and had another son, so she was sidelined into loneliness. Jenny takes pity realising her backstory and allows her to stay, warning Daisy that she will be watching her behaviour closely.

Development

Characterisation and troublemaking
On her character, Jordan said: "Daisy has been a delight to play so far with her lack of filter and flirty nature but there’s certainly more to her than meets the eye. I’m excited to flesh her out and see what lies ahead for hers and Jenny’s relationship." She commented on Daisy's bluntness, stating that she does not have a filter and that she tends to say what she thinks without thinking of the consequences. Jordan also opined that there are a lot of routes that could be taken with her character and that she is a "work in progress". She explained that despite Daisy being mainly concerned for herself, she does love Jenny a lot due to being loyal to the people she loves. Jordan described Jenny as the only mother figure that Daisy has encountered throughout her life, and due to the happiness that Daisy associates with Jenny, she wants to rebuild their connection. Jordan also stated that Daisy believes Jenny's husband Johnny is not good enough for Jenny and said that "he needs to go" since "she just instantly hates [him]". Jordan admitted that her character does not go about things in the best way, but defended her actions since they have the objective of making Jenny happy in the long term. Jordan also revealed that producers have informed her of a "potential love match" for Daisy, hinting that they are "very different" to her. Jordan later said that her character sees men as toys and would only get a love interest if she was bored. She hinted that when Daisy does become bored, she would "go around seeing what sort of trouble she can stir up".

Speaking to Digital Spy, Jordan stated that she has had various conversations with the script editors, storyliners and producers about her character's potential to be a villain on the soap. She said that as of May 2021, the production team were still deciding "just how dark can [they] make her". Jordan responded to the production team's unset plans by portraying Daisy as both humane and "totally psychotic". Despite her uncertainty on where her character was headed, Jordan liked how Daisy is "a bit of a troublemaker, she's a bit minxy and she's got a bit of a backstory behind it" since it allowed her to "play all sides of the spectrum". Daisy's afore mentioned backstory involves her telling Jenny that she has nowhere else to go, which leads Jenny to take pity on her and allow her to stay despite her troublemaking. On whether or not Daisy is lying, Jordan opined that Daisy is telling the truth. She enjoyed portraying a vulnerable side to Daisy, which she felt contrasted to her character being "fake towards everybody just to get what she wants". Jordan also appreciated having a backstory for her character, branding Daisy a "survivor" due to coming out of her bad childhood with a headstrong attitude. On Daisy's confession to Jenny about her childhood, Jordan explained: "This is her stripped back and saying: 'This is what happened to me and I really don't want to go, so please don't kick me out, which I think is a really nice side to see of her, because no-one's born horrible. No-one's born a bitch or a villain or whatever you want to call it – they're made that way." Speaking further on Daisy's potential as a villain with Stuff, Jordan likened Daisy to fellow Coronation Street character Tracy Barlow (Kate Ford). She explained that they are similar since they both will do whatever they can to protect themselves, and Jordan hoped Daisy could become "an iconic bad girl" like Tracy in the future. The actress said that playing a character that causes mischief and raises people's eyebrows is a more fun role to play than that of a regular character, especially since Jordan felt she is so different to her character in her personal life.

Relationship with Daniel Osbourne
In June 2021, scenes of Daisy and Daniel Osbourne (Rob Mallard) arguing aired over him writing an exposé on her ventures with Double Glammy. Viewers then predicted that the pair would embark on a romantic relationship. Months later, scenes see Daisy opening up about the death of her younger brother to Daniel after his son, Bertie (Ellis Blain), has a near-death experience. Ryan, who she is still dating at the time, tries to comfort Daisy but the Manchester Evening News suggested that Daisy had "already firmly moved on" to Daniel. She eventually dumps Ryan and begins a relationship with Daniel, but the pairing breaks apart due to their differences. They later reconcile in a secret relationship since they receive negativity from the people in their life about their relationship. On their relationship, Jordan said that he "brings out the more human side of Daisy", while Daisy loosens his strict ways up. Jordan said that her character's feelings for Daniel are genuine despite not wanting to get into a serious relationship with him. She is a fan of the relationship and enjoys the contradiction of personalities, as she feels that Daniel can steer her towards being less selfish. They later go public with their relationship.

When Daniel's ex-girlfriend, Nicky Wheatley (Kimberly Hart-Simpson), returns, Jordan said that Daisy's reaction would be "ruthless". Since Nicky applies for a job at Daniel's school, it makes Daisy take "desperate action" to prevent the pair from reconciling. Jordan said that Nicky's return to Weatherfield is a red flag for Daisy and due to being a reactive and impulsive character, she instantly acts on the threat. Daisy is initially unaware that Nicky worked as a sex worker, and while Jordan would want Daisy to be understanding, she said that she would not react "as much maturely as she could". Digital Spy wrote that since viewers had seen Daisy sink low in her previous feuds, viewers should expect the same with Nicky, which Jordan echoed. She said: "she does have a ruthless streak. And like I said, because they've been so on and off, for them to just be getting back on an even field and even footing, I think she's going to try and protect that. Like I say, Daisy bring Daisy, she won't go about it in the right way. But it does come from a place of fear and a place of wanting to be with him, and just sort of wanting to protect what they have." She also hinted her excitement for Daisy and Nicky's feud, as she felt that Coronation Street is known for "strong women showdowns".

Reception
In an interview with Digital Spy, Jordan said that the reaction from viewers of the soap on Instagram were positive. She opined that since viewers enjoy a troublemaker who causes conflict, this was the reason behind her character being well received. She appreciated the "very welcoming and complimentary" attitude from viewers. Jordan also said that the response would likely be negative "if Daisy steps on anybody's toes in the future who are in a relationship".

See also
 List of Coronation Street characters (2020)

References

Coronation Street characters
Female characters in television
Fictional blackmailers
Fictional bartenders
Television characters introduced in 2020